The Qizu Pagoda, located at Fengxue Temple of Ruzhou, Henan province, China is a stone, multi-eaved Chinese pagoda built in 738 during the Tang Dynasty. The pagoda was built in honor of a Buddhist monk, while the name of the structure was given by Emperor Xuanzong of Tang himself.

This brick pagoda is located behind the main hall of the temple. It has nine stories, is 27 m (88.5 ft) tall (including the crowning spire), and has a square base. The outstretching eaves of the pagoda form an inverse curve, indicative of pagodas built during the early Tang Dynasty. Its design style is comparable to the Xumi Pagoda built a century earlier.

External links
Qizu Pagoda at China.org.cn

Buildings and structures in Henan
Buddhist temples in Henan
Pagodas in China
Tang dynasty Buddhist temples
Major National Historical and Cultural Sites in Henan
Religious buildings and structures completed in 738
8th-century Buddhist temples